The Capsian culture was a Mesolithic and Neolithic culture centered in the Maghreb that lasted from about 8,000 to 2,700 BC. It was named after the town of Gafsa in Tunisia, which was known as Capsa in Roman times.

Capsian industry was concentrated mainly in modern Tunisia and Algeria, with some lithic sites attested from southern Spain to Sicily. It is traditionally divided into two horizons, the Capsien typique (Typical Capsian) and the Capsien supérieur (Upper Capsian), which are sometimes found in chronostratigraphic sequence. Sometimes, a third period, Capsian Neolithic (6,200–5,300 BP) is also specified. They represent variants of one tradition, the differences between them being both typological and technological.

During this period, the environment of the Maghreb was open savanna, much like modern East Africa, with Mediterranean forests at higher altitudes; where the initial phase overlaps with the African humid period. The Capsian diet included a wide variety of animals, ranging from aurochs and hartebeest to hares and snails; there is little evidence concerning plants eaten. During the succeeding Neolithic of Capsian Tradition, there is evidence from one site, for domesticated, probably imported, ovicaprids.

Anatomically, Capsian populations were modern Homo sapiens, traditionally classed into two variegate types: Proto-Mediterranean and Mechta-Afalou on the basis of cranial morphology.  Some have argued that they were immigrants from the east (Natufians), whereas others argue for population continuity based on physical skeletal characteristics and other criteria.

Given the Capsian culture's timescale, widespread occurrence in the Sahara, and geographic association with modern speakers of the Afroasiatic languages, historical linguists have tentatively associated the industry with the Afroasiatic family's earliest speakers on the continent.

Nothing is known about Capsian religion, but their burial methods suggest a belief in an afterlife.  Decorative art is widely found at their sites, including figurative and abstract rock art, and ochre is found coloring both tools and corpses. Ostrich eggshells were used to make beads and containers; seashells were used for necklaces.  The Ibero-Maurusian practice of extracting the central incisors continued sporadically, but became rarer.

The Eburran industry which dates between 13,000 and 9,000 BC in East Africa, was formerly known as the "Kenya Capsian" due to similarities in the stone blade shapes.

Gallery

See also 
 Ifri n'Amr or Moussa
 Kelif el Boroud
 Prehistory of Central North Africa
 African humid period

References

External links 
 Capsian African Neolithic Tools, Weapons and Artifacts
 Capsian North Africa
 Prof. David Lubell' home page at University of Waterloo
 L'Université de Genève – drawing of mircoliths from upper Capsian

Mesolithic cultures of Africa
Archaeology of Algeria
Archaeology of Libya
Archaeological cultures in Morocco
Archaeology of Tunisia
Hunter-gatherers of Africa
8th-millennium BC establishments
6th-millennium BC disestablishments